Kode IF is a Swedish football club located in Kode.

Background
Kode IF currently plays in Division 4 Göteborg A which is the sixth tier of Swedish football. They play their home matches at the Lunnevi in Kode.

The club is affiliated to Göteborgs Fotbollförbund. Kode IF have competed in the Svenska Cupen on 9 occasions and have played 13 matches in the competition.

Season to season

Footnotes

External links
 Kode IF – Official website
 Kode IF on Facebook

Football clubs in Gothenburg
Association football clubs established in 1950
1950 establishments in Sweden
Football clubs in Västra Götaland County